Dominick Reyes (born December 26, 1989) is an American professional mixed martial artist and former college football player. He currently competes in the Light Heavyweight division of the Ultimate Fighting Championship (UFC). As of January 24, 2023, he is #11 in the UFC light heavyweight rankings.

Background 
Reyes was born in Hesperia, California, on December 26, 1989, and is of Mexican American descent. Reyes was an athlete from a young age: he wrestled and played American football, aspiring to play in the NFL. Reyes grew up in a poor family; his parents encouraged him to pursue sports in order to avoid getting involved with gangs. After graduating from Hesperia High School, he moved to New York to attend Stony Brook University, where he earned his B.S. in Information Systems. 

Reyes was the starting safety for the Stony Brook Seawolves from 2009 to 2012, eventually becoming captain. He twice made the All-Conference team, including being named First Team All-Big South in 2012.
He intercepted a pass in the end zone with 54 seconds remaining in the first round of the 2011 FCS Playoffs to give Stony Brook a 31–28 win over in-state rivals Albany. Reyes graduated from Stony Brook as the program's all-time leader in solo tackles (158), recording 259 tackles in total. While he received attention from NFL teams, his speed was deemed 'average' and he ultimately went undrafted in the 2013 NFL Draft.

Although Reyes attended tryouts for the Canadian Football League afterwards, he had no desire to play for a league that was not top-level. Depressed about the apparent end to his NFL dreams, Reyes returned home to California and worked in construction. He would go on to work manual labor for his father's cabinetry business. He trained for MMA at Combat Cage Academy, his brother Alexander's gym, initially to stay in shape and vent frustration. Reyes started competing in amateur MMA fights shortly after.

In 2017, Reyes accepted a job as an IT Technical Support Specialist at Oak Hills High School in Oak Hills, California. He left the job after two years to focus on UFC full-time. ESPN's Hallie Grossman described his life during this time as "pulling Clark Kent-ish double duty: by day, he was the technology nerd who made sure the campus internet ran smoothly and installed new computers in classrooms. By night, he was the fighter trying to carve a place for himself in MMA, in King of the Cage and Legacy Fighting Alliance and eventually, finally, the UFC."

Mixed martial arts career

Early career

Before signing with the UFC, Reyes amassed an amateur record of 5–0 and was twice the U of MMA champion during his amateur career.

Prior to entering the UFC, Reyes amassed a professional record of 6–0 including a victory that went viral on the internet against Jordan Powell who seemed to be showboating before being knocked out with a head kick.

Ultimate Fighting Championship

Reyes made his promotional debut for the UFC on June 25, 2017, against Joachim Christensen at UFC Fight Night 112. He won the bout via technical knockout in the opening minute of the fight, and he earned the Performance of the Night bonus.

Reyes faced Jeremy Kimball on December 2, 2017, at UFC 218. Reyes won the fight via submission in the first round.

Reyes faced Jared Cannonier on May 19, 2018, at UFC Fight Night 129. He won the fight via TKO in the first round.

Reyes faced Ovince Saint Preux on October 6, 2018, at UFC 229. He won the fight via unanimous decision.

Reyes faced Volkan Oezdemir on March 16, 2019, at UFC on ESPN+ 5. Reyes won the back-and-forth fight by split decision. 11 media outlets scored the fight in favor of Oezdemir while 8 media outlets scored it for Reyes. 

Reyes faced Chris Weidman on October 18, 2019, at UFC on ESPN 6 in the main event. He won the fight via knockout in round one. This win earned him the Performance of the Night award.

Reyes faced Jon Jones on February 8, 2020, for the UFC Light Heavyweight Championship at UFC 247. He lost the fight via a controversial unanimous decision. 14 of 21 media outlets scored the contest for Reyes, with 7 scoring it for Jones.

Reyes faced Jan Błachowicz for the vacant UFC Light Heavyweight Championship on September 27, 2020 at UFC 253. He lost the fight via technical knockout in the second round.

Reyes was expected to face the inaugural and former Rizin FF Light Heavyweight Champion Jiří Procházka on February 27, 2021, at UFC Fight Night 186 to serve as the event headliner. However, on late January, it was reported that Reyes was pulled from the fight, citing injury, and the bout was rescheduled for May 1 at UFC on ESPN: Reyes vs. Procházka. In a back and forth fight, Reyes managed to stun Procházka a few times, but was eventually overwhelmed by Procházka's volume, and was knocked out via a spinning back elbow in the second round. Reyes suffered multiple facial fractures in his knockout defeat to Procházka. This bout earned Reyes a Fight of the Night bonus award.

Reyes faced Ryan Spann on November 12, 2022, at UFC 281. At the weigh-ins, Spann weighed in at 206.6 pounds, six tenths of a pound over the light heavyweight non-title fight limit. The bout proceeded at a catchweight with Spann fined 20% of his purse, which went to Reyes. He lost the fight via knockout in the first round.

Personal life 
Reyes was nicknamed "The Devastator" because of his calamitous kicks. He is a fan of the Los Angeles Lakers and Los Angeles Dodgers and he enjoys snowboarding, wakeboarding, mountain bike riding, dirt bike riding, and watching documentary shows on TV. Reyes has an older brother, Alex Reyes, who has competed in the Light Heavyweight division of the Ultimate Fighting Championship.

Championships and accomplishments
Ultimate Fighting Championship
Performance of the Night (Two times) 
Fight of the Night (One time)

Mixed martial arts record

|-
|Loss
|align=center|12–4
|Ryan Spann
|KO (punches)
|UFC 281
|
|align=center|1
|align=center|1:20
|New York City, New York, United States
|
|-
|Loss
|align=center|12–3
|Jiří Procházka
|KO (spinning back elbow)
|UFC on ESPN: Reyes vs. Procházka
|
|align=center|2
|align=center|4:29
|Las Vegas, Nevada, United States
|
|-
|Loss
|align=center|12–2
|Jan Błachowicz
|TKO (punches)
|UFC 253 
|
|align=center|2
|align=center|4:36
|Abu Dhabi, United Arab Emirates
| 
|-
|Loss
|align=center|12–1
|Jon Jones
|Decision (unanimous)
|UFC 247 
|
|align=center|5
|align=center|5:00
|Houston, Texas, United States
|
|-
|Win
|align=center|12–0
|Chris Weidman
|KO (punches)
|UFC on ESPN: Reyes vs. Weidman 
|
|align=center|1
|align=center|1:43
|Boston, Massachusetts, United States
|
|-
|Win
|align=center|11–0
|Volkan Oezdemir
|Decision (split)
|UFC Fight Night: Till vs. Masvidal 
|
|align=center|3
|align=center|5:00
|London, England
|
|-
|Win
|align=center|10–0
|Ovince Saint Preux
|Decision (unanimous)	
|UFC 229 
|
|align=center|3
|align=center|5:00
|Las Vegas, Nevada, United States
|
|-
|Win
|align=center|9–0
|Jared Cannonier
|TKO (punches)
|UFC Fight Night: Maia vs. Usman
|
|align=center|1
|align=center|2:55
|Santiago, Chile
|
|-
|Win
|align=center|8–0
|Jeremy Kimball
|Submission (rear-naked choke)	
|UFC 218 
|
|align=center|1
|align=center|3:39
|Detroit, Michigan, United States
|
|-
|Win
|align=center|7–0
|Joachim Christensen
|TKO (punches) 
|UFC Fight Night: Chiesa vs. Lee
|
|align=center|1
|align=center|0:29
|Oklahoma City, Oklahoma, United States
|
|-
|Win
|align=center|6–0
|Jordan Powell
|KO (head kick)
|LFA 13
|
|align=center|1
|align=center|0:53
|Burbank, California, United States
|
|-
|Win
|align=center|5–0
|Marcus Govan
|KO (head kick)
|Hoosier Fight Club 32
|
|align=center|1
|align=center|0:27
|Michigan City, Indiana, United States
|
|-
|Win
|align=center|4–0
|Tyler Smith
|TKO (punches)
|King of the Cage: Martial Law
|
|align=center|1
|align=center|1:35
|Ontario, California, United States
|
|-
|Win
|align=center|3–0
|Kelly Gray
|Decision (unanimous)
|King of the Cage: Sinister Intentions
|
|align=center|3
|align=center|5:00
|Las Vegas, Nevada, United States
|
|-
|Win
|align=center|2–0
|Jessie Glass
|Submission (guillotine choke)
|Gladiator Challenge: Carnage
|
|align=center|1
|align=center|0:55
|Rancho Mirage, California, United States
|
|-
|Win
|align=center|1–0
|Jose Rivas Jr.
|TKO (punches)
|King of the Cage: Fisticuffs
|
|align=center|1
|align=center|3:23
|Highland, California, United States
|
|-

See also
List of current UFC fighters
List of male mixed martial artists

References

External links
 
 

Living people
1989 births
American male mixed martial artists
Light heavyweight mixed martial artists
Mixed martial artists utilizing Brazilian jiu-jitsu
Mixed martial artists from California
People from Hesperia, California
Stony Brook Seawolves football players
Ultimate Fighting Championship male fighters
American mixed martial artists of Mexican descent
American practitioners of Brazilian jiu-jitsu